Zrenjanin Grammar School building was built in 1846, in Gimnazijska street, Zrenjanin.

History 
Zrenjanin Grammar School (Serbian: Zrenjaninska gimnazija / Зрењанинска гимназија) was established in 1846 as a Piarist school. It is the oldest secondary school in Zrenjanin. At the beginning, school was primarily Hungarian, although Serbs were large minority in Veliki Bečkerek. Students were obligatory to learn Hungarian and German language (after 1907 only Hungarian). Grammar school became Serbian after 1918. School today has one class in Hungarian language.

Famous students 
 Branimir Brstina, actor
 Goran Knežević, politician and a mayor of Zrenjanin
 Kija Kockar, singer and a TV personality
 Vasilije Krestić, historian
 Gyula Pártos, Hungarian architect
 Čedomir Popov, historian, current chairman of Matica srpska

Building 
It was built in 1846. It has two floors. It was enlarged in 1937, by adding yard wing. Unfortunately, street facade lost its decoration  after World War II. The Piarist church was built at the same time as building, just aside it, as a part of Grammar School complex.

Zrenjanin
Buildings and structures in Vojvodina
Piarist Order